Meishi Smile is a Los Angeles based band formed by producer, vocalist, and songwriter Faye Yim (born Garrett Yim). The name Meishi Smile was first used in 2010. The project has elements of noise music, J-pop and shoegaze.

Career
In 2014, the first Meishi Smile album, LUST, was released on Attack The Music and Zoom Lens. Later that year, Yim released a new single called Star on Maltine Records.

In January 2015, Yim debuted their first video on national television on Adult Swim with the video "AJS."

On May 21, 2015, Yim announced through an interview with The Fader that they were working on a forthcoming album entitled ...Belong

On May 28, 2015, Yim premiered a new single entitled Breathe.

In 2020, the music project led formerly only by Yim was announced to have turned into a band. Yim is the vocalist, songwriter, producer, and visual artist for Meishi Smile.

Discography

Studio albums (as Meishi Smile)

Extended plays (as Meishi Smile)

Singles

Digital albums

 May 2020: 【E T H E R 0 1】
 Oct 2020: Hate Floods Slow
 Dec 2020: Flowers (Under All My Shadows)
 Sept 2021: All The Joy of Your Happy Songs
 Nov 2021: Love, In The Time of Virus

Compilations
2012: Nothin’ Compares Compilation (Orchid Tapes) - track "Pale (Alternative Version)"
2013: ANGELTOWN Showcase Compilation (Orchid Tapes) - track "Us"
2014: Boring Ecstasy: The Bedroom Pop of Orchid Tapes (Orchid Tapes) - track "Sincerity"

See also
Zoom Lens (record label)
Orchid Tapes

References 

American electronic musicians
Musicians from California